Disco Donnie Presents (DDP) is an electronic dance music event production company, founded by James "Disco" Donnie Estopinal. Since the company's inception in 1994, DDP has sold over 16 million tickets producing over 16,000 live events, arena shows, and outdoor festivals in over 100 markets around the world including the U.S., Mexico, Canada, and Latin America. Annually, DDP is responsible for organizing and promoting nearly 1,000 club events across the U.S. ranging from Portland, Philadelphia, Houston, Tampa, New Orleans, Dallas, and St. Louis to name only a few; plus major festivals such as Ubbi Dubbi, Sunset Music Festival, Freaky Deaky, Sun City Music Festival, The Day After, and Ultimate Music Experience.
 
Founder and CEO, James "Disco Donnie" Estopinal, Jr. is considered one of the godfathers of U.S. electronic dance music, evolving over the past 27 years to become one of the top dance music promoters globally. From his early days in the 1990s New Orleans dance scene, Disco Donnie coupled eccentricity with ingenuity to create elaborately themed parties that charmed patrons, garnered an international following, and unwittingly became a catalyst for a national debate over the First Amendment right to expression.

History 
James "Disco Donnie" Estopinal, Jr. first began hosting dance music parties in New Orleans in 1994 after graduating from Louisiana State University.Louisiana State University.  Donnie threw parties under many different company aliases such as Moon Patrol and Freebass Society before eventually settling on Disco Productions, the precursor to Disco Donnie Presents.

Disco Productions and Freebass Society 1995-2007 

Disco Donnie organized many parties under different company monikers including Disco Productions, Moon Patrol, and Freebass Society before eventually landing on Disco Donnie Presents.

State Palace Theater 1995 
Donnie scores his first legitimate venue, New Orleans’ historic State Palace Theater.

Initial Expansion 1997 
Donnie expands into throwing raves in Houston, Austin, Atlanta, Louisiana and Mississippi in both legit and underground venues including an abandoned movie theater, a six-story warehouse (rent: $1,000), the Austin Music Hall and others. Featured talent includes Frankie Bones, Paul Oakenfold, the Crystal Method, Keoki, Clint Mansell (Pop Will Eat Itself, film composer for Requiem for a Dream & Black Swan), LTJ Bukem, Derrick Carter, Freaky Chakra, Single Cell Orchestra and SS and many others.

Crack House Statute 1998 

In the Fall of 2000, Estopinal became the first rave promoter ever indicted under the federal "crack house" statute, an archaic provision of the Anti-Drug Abuse Act of 1986 which stipulated that anyone who owned, leased, or rented a property "for the purpose of manufacturing, distributing or using any controlled substance" could be criminally prosecuted.
 
" This law allowed the Justice Department to prosecute property owners of venues where "rave parties" were thrown, and the promoters who threw them.[4] The legislation was authored by then U.S. Senator Joe Biden of Delaware, who by the early 2000s had become an enthusiastic proponent of using the crack-era law against rave promoters like Estopinal.
The State Palace Theatre was eventually fined $100,000 in 2001 and allowed to stay open as long as they banned drug paraphernalia like glow sticks and pacifiers.

EDC 1999 
Disco Donnie partners with Pasquale Rotella's Insomniac on Nocturnal Wonderland in Los Angeles and then later on Electric Daisy Carnival.  So many people show up that the riot police use tear gas to break up the crowd outside the gates.  At the end of the night, 8,000 people got in, with another 15,000 hoping to get access.

"Operation Rave Review" January 2000 
Drug Enforcement Agency (DEA) begins "Operation Rave Review" targeting the owners of the State Palace Theater in New Orleans and a certain event producer there, specifically, Donnie and his raves.  DEA surveillance on Donnie continues for eight months.

DEA Raid August 2000 
 DEA raids the State Palace Theater and office under the theory that the venue and/or Donnie are smuggling drugs inside the sound equipment and selling them from backstage using runners with VIP credentials.  Agents search, and even up the speakers but only bust a bartender in possession of a single marijuana cigarette.  After a long fruitless search, the Feds left and Donnie opened his show for business that night.

Crack House Law Prosecution 2001 
January 2001 - Federal prosecutors charge Donnie under the Crack House Law seeking to put him in prison for 20 years and hundreds of thousands in fines. Donnie is also threatened with being charged with a CCE (continuing criminal enterprise).  Donnie keeps throwing parties anyway, despite the occasional shut down by the cops, and then starts a weekly at House of Blues, New Orleans.  Donnie and the manager of the State Palace Theater enter "not guilty" pleas and seek a dismissal. The American Civil Liberties Union (ACLU) takes the case. Donnie becomes an unlikely civil rights hero in the dance music community.

March 2001 - Donnie emerges victorious and the drug-free bass bins boom again at his first surveillance-free rave at the State Palace Theater.

Later in 2001 - Donnie moves to Ohio and expands into producing shows in Columbus, Cleveland, Cincinnati, Detroit, Pittsburgh, Nashville, and Memphis.  Another Ohio promoter does not have the money to pay DJ Paul van Dyk, so Donnie loans him $5,000.  Instead of paying Paul, the promoter robs Donnie and skips town.  Donnie quickly becomes the most-trusted top promoter in Columbus.

The RAVE Act 2003 
Congress passes the RAVE Act, or the longer version—Reducing Americans Vulnerability to Ecstasy.  Senator Joe Biden pushed this legislation.

Insomniac Events 2008-2012 
After years of collaborations in California, Donnie partnered with Pasquale Rotella, CEO of Insomniac Events, setting their sights on strategically developing the Insomniac brand throughout the US. Including bringing EDC to Dallas, Orlando, Puerto Rico, New York, and Las Vegas, and also bringing Nocturnal Wonderland to Austin, Beyond Wonderland to Seattle, and co-founding Electric Forest in Michigan.

SFX 2012 

After strategizing how to roll up electronic music companies to make them stronger, Donnie puts together a pitch deck and gets it to Bob Sillerman, the man who created Live Nation. Donnie's deck later forms the basis for SFX's roll up strategy.  Sillerman's first acquisition was Disco Donnie Presents. With Donnie's guidance and relationships, SFX picks up Electric Zoo, ID&T, React, Beatport, Flavorus and many more.
Robert F. X. Sillerman

In 2013 - Afrojack rings the bell at NASDAQ to celebrate Sillerman making SFX a publicly traded company.

DDP goes international 2014 
Disco Donnie Presents expands into international markets and produces shows in Canada, Mexico, Panama, and Dominican Republic. Including club shows, and international festivals such as The Day After + more.

Surviving SFX Bankruptcy 2016
SFX declares bankruptcy.  Despite the scarcity of cash, Donnie makes sure that all of his vendors were paid, and continues to produce club shows, concerts and festivals across North America.

In 2016 - LiveStyle emerges as the new corporate umbrella for Disco Donnie Presents, React, Made and Beatport.  Donnie starts working with LiveStyle's then-CEO Randy Phillips.

Return to Independence 2020 
April 1, 2020 - Disco Donnie is the first electronic music company founder to buy his company back. To date, Disco Donnie Presents has produced over 16,000 shows and sold over 16,000,000 tickets in over 100 different cities since its inception.

Regional promotion partners 
The regional partners that Disco Donnie Presents works with on a regular basis include NightCulture, Sugar Society, Sunset Events, Full Access, Steve LeVine Entertainment & Public Relations, Red Cube, SMG Events, Heavier Than Gravity, Global Groove Events, Ampersand Events, Ultimo, B&W Productions, Tru Events, Amplified Access, Eventvibe, Stellar Spark Events, Committee Entertainment, Cult Entertainment Group, My Best Friends Party, and Party Bassics.

Festivals and notable events 
Upon its launch in 1994, Disco Donnie Presents has thrown 7,000 live events, arena shows and outdoor festivals in over 100 markets around the globe. Noteworthy events include Something Wicked in Houston, Texas, Sunset Music Festival in Tampa, Florida, Sun City Music Festival in El Paso, Texas, Alive Music Festival in Mexico, the Ultimate Music Experience on South Padre Island, Texas, Sound Wave Music Festival in Arizona, and the Zoolu party in New Orleans, Louisiana.

Freaky Deaky Texas 
After shelving the Something Wicked brand, and during the SFX days, Donnie partners with React in 2018 to bring Chicago's premier Halloween dance music experience to Houston, Texas. The first year sells 25,000 tickets. In 2019, the event moved from Sam Houston Race Park to Houston Raceway Park and became wholly owned by Disco Donnie Presents. In 2020, the event combined with Ubbi Dubbi for a supersized event, Ubbi Dubbi Gets Freaky Deaky, but was later postponed due to the COVID-19 pandemic.

The Day After Festival 
Day After Festival is a carnival-themed experience in Panamà City, Panamà that takes place on the second weekend of January. The festival debuted in 2013 with regional partner ShowPro. A partnership with and ShowPro was announced later that year and the event expanded to three days for the 2014 edition. Located at Figali Plaza Convention Center, the event has hosted names like Hardwell, NERVO, Afrojack, and David Guetta.

Something Wicked Festival 
Something Wicked is Houston's first Halloween EDM massive. Disco Donnie Presents and NightCulture debuted the event in 2012 at Sam Houston Race Park, where the event continues to be held. The first Something Wicked had an estimated total of 12,000 attendees.

Something Wonderful Festival 
In 2015, Disco Donnie Presents and Nightculture debuted Something Wicked's springtime sister event, Something Wonderful in Dallas. Something Wonderful was held at the Cotton Bowl. In 2016, the event was moved to Texas Motor Speedway, where it was held in 2017. The event was shelved in 2018 and replaced by Disco Donnie Presents's new springtime Dallas festival, Ubbi Dubbi.[27]

Sun City Music Festival 
Sun City Music Festival was the first EDM massive to be hosted in El Paso, Texas. Falling on Labor Day Weekend each year, Cohen Stadium hosted the first Sun City and Ascarate Park has hosted the event ever since.

Sunset Music Festival 
Tampa's Sunset Music Festival launched in 2012 marking it the first EDM massive for the city. The event occurs every Memorial Day Weekend. In early 2014, Disco Donnie Presents and regional partner Sunset Events announced that the event would expand to two days.

Ubbi Dubbi Music Festival 
Ubbi Dubbi is Disco Donnie's newest festival brand which takes us into a world curated by two whimsical characters known as Ubbi & Dubbi. Its inaugural year saw great success, with its 2020 follow up postponed due to COVID-19 pandemic. In 2021, the event moved to Texas Motorplex in Ennis, Texas. In 2022, the event was moved back to Panther Island and took away the camping features, for undisclosed reasoning.

Ultimate Music Experience 
Ultimate Music Experience is America's largest spring break EDM festival which generally takes place the second week of March at Schlitterbahn Water Park on South Padre Island, Texas. Disco Donnie Presents, Global Groove and Sugar Society launched the event in 2011 as a two-day event but it has since grown to become a three-day event as well as an opening party.

Zoolu 
Zoolu is a three-day experience and the longest running party for Disco Donnie Presents. Taking place every Mardi Gras weekend at the State Palace Theater from 1995 to 2006, in 2007, the event was forced to relocate due to severe interior damage caused by Hurricane Katrina.

Charitable contributions 
Through the growth of ticket sales, Disco Donnie Presents has been able to donate to many local charities and organizations.

Over the last 10 years, DDP has donated over $600,000 to local charities and local groups following its festival events. At Ubbi Dubbi Festival in 2021 (Ennis,Texas), DDP donated $35,000 to local charities. The donation consisted of $15,000 to the NorthTexas Food Bank, and $20,000 to Ennis Cares, a local organization invested in helping the local community in a variety of areas, such as fighting local hunger and assistance for the elderly. In 2021, DDP and Sunset Music Festival donated $50,000 to local Tampa charities, including $25,000 to the Moffitt Cancer Center for Adolescent and Young Adult Program and $25,000 to the Bay Pines VA Healthcare System in Florida. The VA donation provided support to various programs, including Creative Arts, Mental Health, Recreation Programs, Social Work Programs and Women Veterans. Most recently, DDP has committed $1,000,000 in tickets First Responders, veterans and Gold Star families.

$1 Million Dollar Ticket Donation 
The donation was made to non-profit organizations Vet Tix and 1st Tix. Vet Tix and 1st Tix (which is powered by Vet Tix) are national 501(c)(3) non-profit foundations supporting our military and first responder communities. These services provide free event tickets to first responders, currently serving military, veterans, and gold-star families to sporting events, concerts, performing arts, and family activities.

The donation is dedicated in memory of PFC Jason Hill Estopinal, Donnie's younger cousin, who was killed in action in Afghanistan in 2010 during his service in Operation Enduring Freedom.

“Our first responders and veterans are the ones who keep us safe and they've had a rough year. We wanted to show them some love, honor their work, and spark a little joy, by welcoming our heroes to our best festivals and club shows. We invite other promoters from all types of music to join us in this effort,” Disco Donnie said.

The $1,000,000 worth of tickets donation follows up on a $150,000 donation of 2021 Freaky Deaky Texas tickets, which just took place this past Halloween. In addition to ticket donations, Freaky Deaky has also made donations to local groups, including $10,000 to the Houston Food Bank and $10,000 to the Texas Association of First Responders. DDP also donated $25,000 to Americares for Hurricane Ida relief. In total, DDP has donated over $500,000 to local charities where the festivals are operated. DDP's combined ticket and cash donations over the past eight years total over $1.5 million, reinforcing their commitment to giving back and supporting the communities that support them.

Bob Moog Foundation 
The partnership with Disco Donnie Presents and the Bob Moog Foundation seeks to educate and inspire elementary school students through the integration of science and music in their curriculum.

Dr. Bob's Sonic Workshop 
With a portion of the ticket sales from Houston's Something Wicked 2013, The Bob Moog Foundation, DDP, NightCulture and Stereo Live were able to present the Dr. Bob's Sonic Workshop to the entire student body at Cornelius Elementary School in December 2013. The workshop consisted of two parts: An interactive sonic experience and a 45-minute presentation of the science of sound. The workshop inspires creativity in students by education students by providing an introduction into the physics and science of electronic music.

References

Companies based in New York City
Electronic music event management companies
Entertainment companies established in 1994
Companies that filed for Chapter 11 bankruptcy in 2016